Henry Blackett (c. 1820 – 11 July 1907) was a New Zealand storekeeper and politician, he was born in Durham, England in circa 1820, he was the first Mayor of Rangiora.

References

1820 births
1907 deaths
Mayors of places in Canterbury, New Zealand
English emigrants to New Zealand
19th-century New Zealand politicians